Charlie Ferguson may refer to:

Charlie Ferguson (1880s pitcher) (1863–1888), American, Major League Baseball pitcher
Charlie Ferguson (1900s pitcher) (1875–1931), American, Major League Baseball pitcher
Charlie Ferguson (footballer, born 1910) (1910–1995), Scottish football player and manager
Charlie Ferguson (footballer, born 1930), (1930–2017), Scottish football player

See also
Charley Ferguson (1939–2023), American football player
Charles Ferguson (disambiguation)